San Miguel High School is a private Catholic and Lasallian college and college preparatory school located on the south side of Tucson, Arizona, United States. It is a member of the Cristo Rey Network of work-study schools.

History 
San Miguel High School opened in 2004 to assist capable, students from families of limited means to prepare for college. It follows the Cristo Rey work-study model, whereby students work in businesses five days a month to earn 40% of their tuition. In its first nine years, the school had 492 graduates, all of whom were admitted to college. Current enrollment is 365, with 54 on the staff. About 95% of the students are Hispanic.

Academics
A total of 24 credits are required for graduation, as is participation in the Corporate Internship program. Four credits are required in English, mathematics, religious studies, and science; three in foreign language and social studies; and one in visual/performing arts and in academic skills/literacy.

Corporate partners 
There are currently over 100 corporate partners that employ San Miguel students as part of the Corporate Internship Program. Videos are available on various aspects of the San Miguel experience.

Student activities 
All students make a daylong retreat in each of the first three years and in the senior year a three-day Kairos retreat. The school also offers a five-day border immersion program, El Otro Lado, for students and staff to become informed and to strengthen their Christian perspective on the US-Mexican border problem.
Athletics:
 Women's
 Cheer
 Soccer
 Softball
 Volleyball
 Men's
 Baseball
 Volleyball
 Basketball
 Soccer

Clubs:
 Rocketry 
 Robotics
 Student Government (Freshman Council, Sophomore Council, Junior Council, Senior Council, and Executive Council)
 El Otro Lado 
 Yearbook 
 School Choir 
 Ambassadors 
 Honor Societies (National Spanish Society, National English Society, and National Honors Society)
 Environmental Club
 Bahay Pag-asa

Additional school facts 
 42% of families in the area earn less than $25,000 per year
 half of the adults in the area do not have a high school education
 80% of students qualify for free lunch.
 80% of students are the first in their families to go to college.
 63% of students attend a four-year university or college.
 72% of San Miguel graduates have either graduated from college or are persisting in college, according to the National Student Clearinghouse Report 2015.

References

Further reading
 Kearney, G. R. More Than a Dream: The Cristo Rey Story: How One School's Vision Is Changing the World. Chicago, Ill: Loyola Press, 2008.

External links
 Partners - Cristo Rey Network
 "Fr. John P. Foley honored with Presidential Citizen's Medal"
 Boston Globe - "With sense of purpose, students cut class for a day"
Cristo Rey featured in Washington Post column by George Will
 Bill & Melinda Gates Foundation - "Success of Innovative Urban Catholic School Sparks Major Investment"

Catholic secondary schools in Arizona
Lasallian schools in the United States
Catholic Church in Arizona
Schools in Tucson, Arizona
Cristo Rey Network
Poverty-related organizations
Educational institutions established in 2004
2004 establishments in Arizona